An electrical enclosure is a cabinet for electrical or electronic equipment to mount switches, knobs and displays and to prevent electrical shock to equipment users and protect the contents from the environment. The enclosure is the only part of the equipment which is seen by users. It may be designed not only for its utilitarian requirements, but also to be pleasing to the eye. Regulations may dictate the features and performance of enclosures for electrical equipment in hazardous areas, such as petrochemical plants or coal mines. Electronic packaging may place many demands on an enclosure for heat dissipation, radio frequency interference and electrostatic discharge protection, as well as functional, esthetic and commercial constraints.

Standards
Internationally, IEC 60529 classifies the ingress protection rating (IP Codes) of enclosures.

In the United States, the National Electrical Manufacturers Association (NEMA) publishes NEMA enclosure type standards for the performance of various classes of electrical enclosures. The NEMA standards cover corrosion resistance, ability to protect from rain and submersion, etc.

Materials
Electrical enclosures are usually made from rigid plastics, or metals such as steel, stainless steel, or aluminum. Steel cabinets may be painted or galvanized. Mass-produced equipment will generally have a customized enclosure, but standardized enclosures are made for custom-built or small production runs of equipment. For plastic enclosures ABS is used for indoor applications not in harsh environments. Polycarbonate, glass-reinforced, and fiberglass boxes are used where stronger cabinets are required, and may additionally have a gasket to exclude dust and moisture. 

Metal cabinets may meet the conductivity requirements for electrical safety bonding and shielding of enclosed equipment from electromagnetic interference. Non-metallic enclosures may require additional installation steps to ensure metallic conduit systems are properly bonded.

Stainless steel and carbon steel
Carbon steel and stainless steel are both used for enclosure construction due to their high durability and corrosion resistance. These materials are also moisture resistant and chemical resistant. They are the strongest of the construction options. Carbon steel can be hot or cold rolled. Hot rolled carbon steel is used for stamping and moderate forming applications. Cold rolled sheet is produced from low carbon steel and then cold reduced to a certain thickness and can meet ASTM A3666  and ASTM A611 requirements. 

Stainless steel enclosures are suited for medical, pharma, and food industry applications since they are bacterial and fungal resistant due to their non-porous quality. Stainless steel enclosures may be specified to permit wash-down cleaning in, for example, food manufacturing areas.

Aluminum 
Aluminum is chosen because of its light weight, relative strength, low cost, and corrosion resistance. It performs well in harsh environments and it is sturdy, capable of withstanding high impact with a high malleable strength. Aluminum also acts as a shield against electromagnetic interference.

Polycarbonate
Polycarbonate used for electrical enclosures is strong but light, non-conductive and non-magnetic. It is also resistant to corrosion and some acidic environments; however, it is sensitive to abrasive cleaners. Polycarbonate is the easiest material to modify.

Fiberglass
Fiberglass enclosures resist chemicals in corrosive applications. The material can be used over all indoor and outdoor temperature ranges. Fiberglass can be installed in environments that are constantly wet.

Terminology
Enclosures for some purposes have partially punched openings (knockouts) which can be removed to accommodate cables, connectors, or conduits. Where they are small and primarily intended to conceal electrical junctions from sight, or protect them from tampering, they are also known as junction boxes, street cabinets or technically as serving area interface.

Telecommunications
Telcordia Technologies has proposed generic requirements for telecommunication equipment cabinets. These requirements were developed with the input of United States service providers, and are intended to provide a suitable environment for telecommunication companies’ electronic and passive equipment that is housed in above-ground cabinets or enclosures (typically pad- or pole-mounted) in an outside plant environment. The proposed standard includes functional design criteria, generic mechanical and environmental requirements, desired features, and performance tests.

Telecommunication huts are fully assembled or modular field-assembled transportable structures capable of housing an electronic communications system. These huts provide a controlled internal environment for the communications equipment and occasional craftspersons. The huts are designed with locks, security, and alarms to discourage access by unauthorized persons. Huts can be provided with a decorative facade to comply with local building requirements. Telecommunications huts are designed to withstand climate conditions existing throughout the USA including rain, snow, sleet, high winds, ice, sand storms, earthquakes and lightning.

Fire Risk 
Electrical enclosures are prone to fires that can be very intense (in the order of the megawatt) and are hence an important topic of fire safety engineering.

See also
 19 inch rack
 Cable management
 DIN rail
 Housing (engineering)
 Rack unit
 Telco can
 Utility box art
 Utility vault

References

External links 
 NEMA website.
 IEC IP definitions, and a comparison of IEC<>NEMA definitions
 Types of Enclosures
 Electrical Enclosure with Terminal
 IP Protection Ratings vs. NEMA Equivalency
 What Is an Electrical Enclosure? Definition, Using, Requirements